Cilo was a Swiss manufacturer of bicycles that filed for bankruptcy in 2002. The bicycles were produced on the shores of Lake Geneva in Romanel-sur-Lausanne in the Vaud canton.

Cilo is an acronym for Charles Jean Lausanne-Oron. The abbreviation from the manufacturer's name Jean was changed to an i for ease of pronunciation in French. "Lausanne-Oron" refers to a holding in Lausanne, associated with the industrialisation of the city at the turn of the 20th century.

Hans Knecht became world champion in 1946 riding a Cilo bicycle; other notable riders include Beat Breu, Daniel Gisiger and Tony Rominger.

Cilo co-sponsored the cycling team Cilo–Aufina with Aufina from 1980 to 1986, and then Atari and Ciclolinea in 1992.

The Cilo of the mid-1970s was a racing bicycle made of Reynolds 531 with the typical Swiss attention to detail. It had chromed forks, drop-outs and rear stays. All lugs were chromed and polished. The components included full 'top-of-the-line' Campagnolo, although Campy brakes were an option. Brooks saddle, Cinelli road bars and stem, Christophe clips and straps were provided. Silk tubulars mounted on Cerchio Fiamme rims were standard.

References

Cycle manufacturers of Switzerland
Companies based in the canton of Vaud
Companies disestablished in 2002